Takestan County (Šahrestân-e Tâkestân) is in Qazvin province, Iran. The capital of the county is the city of Takestan. At the 2006 census, the county's population was 171,520 in 42,969 households. The following census in 2011 counted 172,949 people in 50,247 households. At the 2016 census, the county's population was 172,636 in 52,917 households. Most people of Takestan County are Tat and they speak Tati.

Administrative divisions

The population history of Takestan County's administrative divisions over three consecutive censuses is shown in the following table. The latest census shows four districts, nine rural districts, and five cities.

References

 

Counties of Qazvin Province